In abstract algebra, the biquaternions are the numbers  , where , and  are complex numbers, or variants thereof, and the elements of  multiply as in the quaternion group and commute with their coefficients. There are three types of biquaternions corresponding to complex numbers and the variations thereof:
 Biquaternions when the coefficients are complex numbers.
 Split-biquaternions when the coefficients are split-complex numbers.
 Dual quaternions when the coefficients are dual numbers.

This article is about the ordinary biquaternions named by William Rowan Hamilton in 1844 (see Proceedings of the Royal Irish Academy 1844 & 1850 page 388). Some of the more prominent proponents of these biquaternions include Alexander Macfarlane, Arthur W. Conway, Ludwik Silberstein, and Cornelius Lanczos. As developed below, the unit quasi-sphere of the biquaternions provides a representation of the Lorentz group, which is the foundation of special relativity.

In other words, the biquaternions are just the complexification of the quaternions. Viewed as a complex algebra, the biquaternions are isomorphic to the algebra of  complex matrices . They are also isomorphic to several Clifford algebras including , the Pauli algebra , and the even part  of the spacetime algebra.

Definition
Let  be the basis for the (real) quaternions , and let  be complex numbers, then

is a biquaternion. Commutativity of the scalar field with the quaternion group is assumed:

Hamilton introduced the terms bivector, biconjugate, bitensor, and biversor to extend notions used with real quaternions .

Hamilton's primary exposition on biquaternions came in 1853 in his Lectures on Quaternions. The editions of Elements of Quaternions, in 1866 by William Edwin Hamilton (son of Rowan), and in 1899, 1901 by Charles Jasper Joly, reduced the biquaternion coverage in favor of the real quaternions.

Considered with the operations of component-wise addition, and multiplication according to the quaternion group, this collection forms a 4-dimensional algebra over the complex numbers C. The algebra of biquaternions is associative, but not commutative. A biquaternion is either a unit or a zero divisor. The algebra of biquaternions forms a composition algebra and can be constructed from bicomplex numbers.

Place in ring theory

Linear representation
Note the matrix product

.

Because h is the imaginary unit, each of these three arrays has a square equal to the negative of the identity matrix.
When this matrix product is interpreted as i j = k, then one obtains a subgroup of matrices that is isomorphic to the quaternion group. Consequently,

represents biquaternion q = u 1 + v i + w j + x k.
Given any 2 × 2 complex matrix, there are complex values u, v, w, and x to put it in this form so that the matrix ring M(2,C) is isomorphic<ref>Leonard Dickson (1914) Linear Algebras, §13 "Equivalence of the complex quaternion and matric algebras"], page 13, via HathiTrust</ref> to the biquaternion ring.

Subalgebras
Considering the biquaternion algebra over the scalar field of real numbers , the set

forms a basis so the algebra has eight real dimensions.

The subalgebra given by

is ring isomorphic to the plane of split-complex numbers, which has an algebraic structure built upon the unit hyperbola. The elements  and  also determine such subalgebras.

Furthermore,

is a subalgebra isomorphic to the tessarines.

These elements generate the dihedral group of the square. The linear subspace with basis  thus is closed under multiplication, and forms the coquaternion algebra.

Algebraic properties
The biquaternions have two conjugations:
 the complex conjugation of biquaternion coefficients 
where  when 

Note that 

Clearly, if  then  is a zero divisor. Otherwise  is defined over the complex numbers. Further,  is easily verified. This allows an inverse to be defined by

 , if 

Relation to Lorentz transformations

Consider now the linear subspace

 is not a subalgebra since it is not closed under products; for example . Indeed,  cannot form an algebra if it is not even a magma.

Proof: From the definitions,

Proof: 

Proposition: 

Proof: Note first that  means that the sum of the squares of its four complex components is one. Then the sum of the squares of the complex conjugates of these components is also one. Therefore,  Now

Associated terminology
As the biquaternions have been a fixture of linear algebra since the beginnings of mathematical physics, there is an array of concepts that are illustrated or represented by biquaternion algebra.

To view  it is necessary to show some subalgebra structure in the biquaternions. Let  represent an element of the sphere of square roots of minus one in the real quaternion subalgebra . Just as the ordinary complex plane has a unit circle,  has a unit hyperbola given by

Just as the unit circle turns by multiplication through one of its elements, so the hyperbola turns because  Hence these algebraic operators on the hyperbola are called hyperbolic versors.

The space of biquaternions has a natural topology through the Euclidean metric on -space. With respect to this topology,  is a topological group. Moreover, it has analytic structure making it a six-parameter Lie group. Consider the subspace of bivectors  . Then the exponential map
Thus this study of a six-dimensional space serves to introduce the general concepts of Lie theory.

Many of the concepts of special relativity are illustrated through the biquaternion structures laid out. The subspace  corresponds to Minkowski space, with the four coordinates giving the time and space locations of events in a resting frame of reference. Any hyperbolic versor  corresponds to a velocity in direction  of speed   where  is the velocity of light. The inertial frame of reference of this velocity can be made the resting frame by applying the Lorentz boost  given by  since then  so that 
Naturally the hyperboloid  which represents the range of velocities for sub-luminal motion, is of physical interest. There has been considerable work associating this "velocity space" with the hyperboloid model of hyperbolic geometry.  In special relativity, the hyperbolic angle parameter of a hyperbolic versor is called rapidity. Thus we see the biquaternion group  provides a group representation for the Lorentz group.

After the introduction of spinor theory, particularly in the hands of Wolfgang Pauli and Élie Cartan, the biquaternion representation of the Lorentz group was superseded. The new methods were founded on basis vectors in the set

which is called the complex light cone. The above representation of the Lorentz group coincides with what physicists refer to as four-vectors.  Beyond four-vectors, the standard model of particle physics also includes other Lorentz representations, known as scalars, and the -representation associated with e.g. the electromagnetic field tensor. Furthermore, particle physics makes use of the  representations (or projective representations of the Lorentz group) known as left- and right-handed Weyl spinors, Majorana spinors, and Dirac spinors.  It is known that each of these seven representations can be constructed as invariant subspaces within the biquaternions.

As a composition algebra
Although W.R. Hamilton introduced biquaternions in the 19th century, its delineation of its mathematical structure as a special type of algebra over a field was accomplished in the 20th century: the biquaternions may be generated out of the bicomplex numbers in the same way that Adrian Albert generated the real quaternions out of complex numbers in the so-called Cayley–Dickson construction.  In this construction, a bicomplex number (w,z) has conjugate (w,z)* = (w, – z).

The biquaternion is then a pair of bicomplex numbers (a,b), where the product with a second biquaternion (c, d) is

If  then the biconjugate 

When (a,b)* is written as a 4-vector of ordinary complex numbers,

The biquaternions form an example of a quaternion algebra, and it has norm

Two biquaternions p and q satisfy  indicating that N is a quadratic form admitting composition, so that the biquaternions form a composition algebra.

See also
 Biquaternion algebra
 Hypercomplex number
 Joachim Lambek
 MacFarlane's use
 Quotient ring

Notes

References

 Arthur Buchheim (1885)  "A Memoir on biquaternions", American Journal of Mathematics 7(4):293 to 326 from Jstor early  content. 
 .
 William Edwin Hamilton (editor) (1866) [https://books.google.com/books?id=fIRAAAAAIAAJ Elements of Quaternions, University of Dublin Press
 Charles Jasper Joly (editor) (1899) Elements of Quaternions volume I, (1901) volume II, Longmans, Green & Co.
 Kravchenko, Vladislav (2003),  Applied Quaternionic Analysis'', Heldermann Verlag .
 .
 .
 .
 .
 .
 .
 .
 .

Composition algebras
Quaternions
Ring theory
Special relativity
Articles containing proofs
William Rowan Hamilton

de:Biquaternion#Hamilton Biquaternion